Valérie Sajdik is an Austrian pop singer, lyricist, host and actress.

Valerie Sajdik achieved her first chart successes with the girl band C-bra and became famous through lead singing in her band Saint Privat, which was very successful in the mid-2000s.  She has since released three solo albums and tours internationally.  She splits her time between living in Austria and France, and is tri-lingual (French, German, English). February 2010, she was invited to perform at the Vancouver Cultural Olympiads (Francophone Side) and performed on CBC Radio-Canada. She performed "Noyé" written by Vox and also her original "Une fois à la vie", both from her 2010 album, Ich Bin Du Bist. Her third solo album Les Nuits Blanches is a soundtrack of her sleepless ‚White Nights‘ featuring jazz chansons in various languages – French, English, German and Russian.

Discography

Singles

"Mädchen sind doof" (2007)
"Noch einmal" (2007)
"Regen" (2007)

Albums

Picknick (4 May 2007)
Ich Bin Du Bist (19 March 2010)
Les Nuits Blanches (October 2013)

1978 births
Living people
21st-century Austrian women singers
Austrian pop singers
Austrian people of French descent
Austrian people of Polish descent